ASN or Asn may refer to:

Organisations
 ASN Bank, in the Netherlands
 American Society of Nephrology
 American Society for Neurochemistry
 American Society for Nutrition
 Archstone (former ticker symbol), a US real estate investment trust
 Association for the Study of Nationalities, an association devoted to the study of ethnicity and nationalism
 Autorité de sûreté nucléaire, the French nuclear safety authority
 Assistant Secretary of the Navy, the title given to certain civilian senior officials in the United States Department of the Navy
 Australasian Steam Navigation Company, shipping company operating between 1839 and 1887

Computing
 Abstract Syntax Notation One (ASN.1)
 Autonomous System Number, an identifier for a collection of IP networks and routers under the control of one entity
 Access service network, a component in telecommunications networks; See Access network
 asn, the second-level domain name .au, reserved for Australian associations and non-profit organisations
 Address space number, a tag of an Alpha translation lookaside buffer entry

Media
 American Sports Network, a syndicated package of college sports originated by Sinclair Broadcast Group
 All Sports Network, a 24-hour Pan Asian sports channel owned by Yes Television
 Associated Screen News of Canada, producer of newsreels, shorts and industrial films in Canada in the period of 1920 to 1958
 Atlantic Satellite Network, a television channel in Canada now known as CTV Two Atlantic

Transportation
 Advance ship notice, a message used to notify of pending deliveries.
 Addlestone railway station (National Rail code), UK 
 Aviation Safety Network, a website that keeps track of aviation accidents, incidents, and hijackings
 Talladega Municipal Airport (IATA: ASN), an airport in Alabama, US

Other uses
 Adobe Solutions Network, the brand name for worldwide partner programs of Adobe Systems, Inc
 Asparagine (Asn), an amino acid
 Associate of Science in Nursing, a tertiary education nursing degree which typically takes 2–3 years to complete
 Additional Support Needs, a Scottish term equivalent to special needs in the Education (Additional Support for Learning) (Scotland) Act 2004